Zaręby  is a village in the administrative district of Gmina Dziadkowice, within Siemiatycze County, Podlaskie Voivodeship, in north-eastern Poland.

According to the 1921 census, the village was inhabited by 176 people, among whom 172 were Roman Catholic, 1 Orthodox and 3 Mosaic. At the same time, 175 inhabitants declared Polish nationality and 1 Belarusian. There were 34 residential buildings in the village.

References

Villages in Siemiatycze County